Frisby Marsh is a  biological Site of Special Scientific Interest east of Frisby on the Wreake in Leicestershire.

This site has spring-fed marshes, grassland, woodland and a pool and channel which are relicts of a former ox-bow lake of the adjacent River Wreake. The marshes have a rich flora, with plants such as marsh valerian and marsh arrowgrass.

A public footpath goes through the southern end of the site.

References

Sites of Special Scientific Interest in Leicestershire